Musakhel District may refer to:
Musakhel District, Afghanistan, part of the province of Khost, Afghanistan
Musakhel District, Pakistan, part of the province of Balochistan, Pakistan